The 1925 Philadelphia Athletics season involved the A's finishing second in the American League with a record of 88 wins and 64 losses.

Offseason 
 October 8, 1924: Lefty Grove was purchased by the Athletics from the Baltimore Orioles for $100,600.
 November 17, 1924: Harry Riconda, Dennis Burns, Bob Hasty, Ed Sherling, Charles Rowland (minors), and $50,000 were traded by the Athletics to the Portland Beavers for Mickey Cochrane.

Regular season

Season standings

Record vs. opponents

Roster

Player stats

Batting

Starters by position 
Note: Pos = Position; G = Games played; AB = At bats; H = Hits; Avg. = Batting average; HR = Home runs; RBI = Runs batted in

Other batters 
Note: G = Games played; AB = At bats; H = Hits; Avg. = Batting average; HR = Home runs; RBI = Runs batted in

Pitching

Starting pitchers 
Note: G = Games pitched; IP = Innings pitched; W = Wins; L = Losses; ERA = Earned run average; SO = Strikeouts

Other pitchers 
Note: G = Games pitched; IP = Innings pitched; W = Wins; L = Losses; ERA = Earned run average; SO = Strikeouts

Relief pitchers 
Note: G = Games pitched; W = Wins; L = Losses; SV = Saves; ERA = Earned run average; SO = Strikeouts

Awards and honors

League leaders 
Lefty Grove – American League leader, Strikeouts

Farm system

References

External links
1925 Philadelphia Athletics team page at Baseball Reference
1925 Philadelphia Athletics team page at www.baseball-almanac.com

Oakland Athletics seasons
Philadelphia Athletics season
Philadelphia Athletics